Maimbung, officially the Municipality of Maimbung (Tausūg: كاومن سين ماءيمبوڠ), is a 5th class municipality in the province of Sulu, Philippines. According to the 2020 census, it has a population of 59,597 people.

It was the seat of the Sultanate of Sulu.

History

The town hosted the Daru Jambangan (Palace of Flowers) which was the royal palace of the Sultan of Sulu since historical times. The palace was made of wood, and was destroyed in 1932 by a huge storm. Today, a few arches and posts remain from the once grand palace complex. Many members of the royal family advocated for the reconstruction of the palace, and even its enlargement, however, the government of the Philippines has yet to establish a position or a fund for the matter.

The town was officially cited by the late Sultan Jamalul Kiram III of the Sultanate of Sulu as the capital of the sultanate, and the place where he wished he was buried after death. The late sultan died in 2013 and was buried in the town afterwards. The town hosts a school named after the late sultan.

In 2016, a small replica of Daru Jambangan was built in the neighboring town of Talipao and became a centerpiece for a 'vacation park'. The replica was about 25% of the actual size of the real Daru Jambangan during its heyday. A campaign to restore the Daru Jambanagn in its original location in Maimbung is still ongoing. The National Commission for Culture and the Arts and the National Museum of the Philippines were tasked to faithfully restore or reconstruct the Daru Jambangan in Maimbung.

Geography

Barangays
Maimbung is politically subdivided into 27 barangays.

Climate
Maimbung has a consistently very warm to hot, oppressively humid, and wet tropical rainforest climate (Köppen Af).

Demographics

Economy 

The town is one of the three official ports of the province of Sulu, the other two being Jolo and Siasi. The town is also a known producer of seaweed, a major export product of the Sulu archipelago.

References

External links

 Maimbung Profile at PhilAtlas.com
 [ Philippine Standard Geographic Code]
 Maimbung Profile at the DTI Cities and Municipalities Competitive Index
 Philippine Census Information
 Local Governance Performance Management System

Municipalities of Sulu